Abadjiev or Abadzhiev,  is a masculine occupational Bulgarian surname, a producer of hodden, its feminine counterpart is  , Abadjieva or Abadzhieva. Notable people with the surname include:

Ivan Abadjiev (1932–2017), Bulgarian weightlifter and coach
Vasco Abadjiev (1926–1978), Bulgarian violinist
Lilia Abadjieva
Borislav Abadzhiev (born 1963), Bulgarian boxer
Ivan Abadzhiev (1932–2017), Bulgarian weightlifter
Stefan Abadzhiev (born 1934), Bulgarian footballer

Bulgarian-language surnames